Lake Väsman is a lake in Ludvika Municipality in Dalarna County of Sweden, in the Norrström main basin.

Description

In the past these was steamboat traffic on the lake.

There is a major iron ore deposit below the lake, estimated at 640 million tonnes.
In 2011 the Nordic Iron Ore company said it would try to start mining.

Basin

Lake Väsman is included in the sub-basin called the outlet of Väsman.
Kolbäcksån, which drains the catchment, collects water from three rivers before reaching the sea after .
The catchment area consists mostly of forest  (56%).

Gallery

References

Citations

Sources

Lakes of Dalarna County